Terry Peach (March 18, 1950 - January 20, 2022) was an American farmer and politician from Oklahoma. Peach previously served as the Oklahoma Secretary of Agriculture under Governor of Oklahoma Brad Henry from 2003 to 2011. Peach served concurrently as the Commissioner of Agriculture, having served in that position when he was appointed by Governor Henry in 2003.

Early life and career
Peach operated a family farm and ranch in Mutual, Oklahoma, since 1972. He also owns and operates a farm supply company and an oilfield supply business in Woodward, Oklahoma. He earned his bachelor degree in vocational agriculture from Oklahoma State University. Peach served as the Oklahoma executive director of the Farm Service Agency, an agency within the United States Department of Agriculture, for 1993 to 2000. As executive director, Peach delivered federal agriculture programs to Oklahoma farmers and ranchers through more than 60 county offices across the state.

Secretary of Agriculture
Appointed by Governor of Oklahoma Brad Henry in 2003, Peach previously served as the Oklahoma Secretary of Agriculture and Commissioner of the Oklahoma Department of Agriculture. As the Secretary, Peach protected and educated consumers about Oklahoma's agricultural and livestock productions. He was succeeded in 2011 by Jim Reese, who was appointed by Republican Governor Mary Fallin.

Personal life
Peach was a member of numerous agricultural and civic organizations, including the Oklahoma Farm Bureau and the Oklahoma Farmers Union.

External links
State biography

References

Living people
People from Woodward County, Oklahoma
State cabinet secretaries of Oklahoma
Heads of Oklahoma state agencies
1951 births